The 1985–86 season was Mansfield Town's 49th season in the Football League and 12th in the Fourth Division they finished in 3rd position with 81 points, gaining promotion back to the Third Division.

Final league table

Results

Football League Fourth Division

FA Cup

League Cup

League Trophy

Squad statistics
 Squad list sourced from

References
General
 Mansfield Town 1985–86 at soccerbase.com (use drop down list to select relevant season)

Specific

Mansfield Town F.C. seasons
Mansfield Town